The 2002 season was the 80th season of competitive football in Ecuador.

National leagues

Serie A
Champion: Emelec (10th title)
International cup qualifiers:
2003 Copa Libertadores: Emelec, Barcelona, El Nacional
2002 Copa Sudamericana: Barcelona, Aucas
Relegated: Olmedo, Macará

Serie B
Winner: Técnico Universitario (4th title)
Promoted: Técnico Universitario, Manta
Relegated: LDU Portoviejo

Segunda
Winner: Deportivo Quevedo
Promoted: Deportivo Quevedo

Clubs in international competitions

National teams

Senior team
The Ecuador national team played 15 matches in 2002: three FIFA World Cup matches, to CONCACAF Gold Cup matches, and ten friendlies.

2002 FIFA World Cup

Ecuador participated in their first FIFA World Cup. They were drawn in Group G with Italy, Mexico, and Croatia. They were eliminated from the competition in the Group Stage, but not before registering their first World Cup victory over 1998 third-place finisher, Croatia.

CONCACAF Gold Cup

Ecuador was invited to play in the 2002 CONCACAF Gold Cup, held in the United States. They were drawn into Group D with Haiti and Canada. Despite a tie among all the team in the group, they were eliminated from the competition in the Group Stage by a draw of lots.

Friendlies

External links
 National leagues details on RSSSF

 
2002